Mirabilis tenuiloba common names longlobe four o'clock or maravilla, is a plant species native to the south-western United States and north-eastern Mexico. It has been reported from Baja California, Baja California Sur, southern California (Riverside, San Bernardino, San Diego and Imperial Counties) and Arizona (Pima and Yuma Counties).

Mirabilis tenuiloba is a perennial herb up to 100 cm tall, usually with many glandular hairs. Leaves are broadly egg-shaped, up to 8 cm long and 12 cm across. Flowers are trumpet-shaped or bell-shaped, white or pale pink, up to 18 mm long. Fruits are egg-shaped, dark red-brown, up to 6 mm long.

References

tenuiloba
Flora of Baja California
Flora of Baja California Sur
Flora of California
Flora of Arizona
Flora without expected TNC conservation status